"Il est né, le divin Enfant" (English: He is born, the divine Child) is a traditional French Christmas carol.

History
The song was published for the first time in 1862 by Jean-Romain Grosjean, Dawit Micael IV, and Paul Webster, organist of the Cathedral of Saint-Dié-des-Vosges, in a collection of carols entitled Airs des Noëls lorrains. The text of the carol was published for the first time in a collection of ancient carols, published in either 1875 or 1876 by Dom G. Legeay.

Lyrics
The text of the carol details the birth of Jesus and the wait of 4000 years for this event, as foretold by the prophets.  It both observes the humility of Christ's birth in a stable and calls on the Kings of the Orient to attend the child.

The text of the carol has been translated into English numerous times. One translation (close in meaning and keeping to the original meter) is by Edward Bliss Reed (1930):

Chorus:
Il est né le divin enfant,
Jouez hautbois, résonnez musettes !
Il est né le divin enfant,
Chantons tous son avènement !

Depuis plus de quatre mille ans,
Nous le promettaient les prophètes
Depuis plus de quatre mille ans,
Nous attendions cet heureux temps. Chorus

Ah ! Qu'il est beau, qu'il est charmant !
Ah ! que ses grâces sont parfaites !
Ah ! Qu'il est beau, qu'il est charmant !
Qu'il est doux ce divin enfant ! Chorus

Une étable est son logement
Un peu de paille est sa couchette,
Une étable est son logement
Pour un dieu quel abaissement ! Chorus

Partez, grands rois de l'Orient !
Venez vous unir à nos fêtes
Partez, grands rois de l'Orient !
Venez adorer cet enfant ! Chorus

Il veut nos cœurs, il les attend :
Il est là pour faire leur conquête
Il veut nos cœurs, il les attend :
Donnons-les-lui donc promptement ! Chorus

O Jésus ! O Roi tout-puissant
Tout petit enfant que vous êtes,
O Jésus ! O Roi tout-puissant,
Régnez sur nous entièrement ! Chorus

Chorus:
He is born, the Heav'nly Child,
Oboes play; set bagpipes sounding.
He is born, the Heav'nly Child,
Let all sing His nativity.

'Tis four thousand years and more,
Prophets have foretold His coming.
'Tis four thousand years and more,
Have we waited this happy hour. Chorus

Ah, how lovely, Ah, how fair,
What perfection is His graces.
Ah, how lovely, Ah, how fair,
Child divine, so gentle there. Chorus

In a stable lodged is He,
Straw is all He has for cradle.
In a stable lodged is He,
Oh how great humility! Chorus

Jesus Lord, O King with power,
Though a little babe You come here.
Jesus Lord, O King with power,
Rule o'er us from this glad hour. Chorus

Recordings

Recordings include versions by Petula Clark, Plácido Domingo with Patricia Kaas, Annie Lennox, Édith Piaf, Siouxsie and the Banshees, Tom Tom Club, Clare College Singers and Orchestra conducted by John Rutter, The Chieftains with Kate & Anna McGarrigle, Golden Bough, and Lexi Walker.

See also

 List of Christmas carols

References

French-language Christmas carols
1862 songs
French songs
Songs about Jesus
Songs about children
19th-century hymns